United Amara Bank (abbreviated UAB) is a private commercial bank in Myanmar. It was one of 4 private banks to commence operations in August 2010, the first new financial institutions in the country since the establishment of Innwa Bank in 1997.

The bank is majority owned by Ne Aung, the son of Aung Thaung, who has been blacklisted by the United States Treasury on 31 October 2014 for his membership in the country's ruling military junta, the State Peace and Development Council and his attempts to undermine Burma's economic and political reforms.

References

External links
 Official Website

Banks of Myanmar
Banks established in 2010
2010 establishments in Myanmar
Entities related to Myanmar sanctions